is the sixth single of the Japanese boy band Arashi. The single was released in two editions. While both the regular edition and limited edition contains two songs and its instrumentals, the two have different covers and only the limited edition included cards and a poster. It was certified platinum by the RIAJ for a shipment of 400,000 copies.

Content
"Jidai" was used as the theme song for the drama Kindaichi Shonen no Jikenbo 3 starring Arashi member Jun Matsumoto in his first lead role. The single is also the last single to be released under the Pony Canyon label before the group moved to their private label J Storm by the end of 2001. On September 19, 2001, "Jidai" was named Best Theme Song in the 30th Television Drama Academy Awards.

Track listing
All track arrangements done by Chokkaku

Charts

References

External links
 Jidai product information  
 Jidai Oricon profile 

Arashi songs
2001 singles
Japanese television drama theme songs
2001 songs
Pony Canyon singles